A sliding puzzle, sliding block puzzle, or sliding tile puzzle is a combination puzzle that challenges a player to slide (frequently flat) pieces along certain routes (usually on a board) to establish a certain end-configuration.  The pieces to be moved may consist of simple shapes, or they may be imprinted with colours, patterns, sections of a larger picture (like a jigsaw puzzle), numbers, or letters.

Sliding puzzles are essentially two-dimensional in nature, even if the sliding is facilitated by mechanically interlinked pieces (like partially encaged marbles) or three-dimensional tokens. In manufactured wood and plastic products, the linking and encaging is often achieved in combination, through mortise-and-tenon key channels along the edges of the pieces. In at least one vintage case of the popular Chinese cognate game Huarong Road, a wire screen prevents lifting of the pieces, which remain loose. As the illustration shows, some sliding puzzles are mechanical puzzles. However, the mechanical fixtures are usually not essential to these puzzles; the parts could as well be tokens on a flat board that are moved according to certain rules.

Unlike tour puzzles, a sliding block puzzle prohibits lifting any piece off the board. This property separates sliding puzzles from rearrangement puzzles. Hence, finding moves and the paths opened up by each move within the two-dimensional confines of the board are important parts of solving sliding block puzzles.

The oldest type of sliding puzzle is the fifteen puzzle, invented by Noyes Chapman in 1880; Sam Loyd is often wrongly credited with making sliding puzzles popular based on his false claim that he invented the fifteen puzzle.  Chapman's invention initiated a puzzle craze in the early 1880s.
From the 1950s through the 1980s sliding puzzles employing letters to form words were very popular.  These sorts of puzzles have several possible solutions, as may be seen from examples such as Ro-Let (a letter-based fifteen puzzle), Scribe-o (4x8), and Lingo.

The fifteen puzzle has been computerized (as puzzle video games) and examples are available to play for free on-line from many Web pages. It is a descendant of the jigsaw puzzle in that its point is to form a picture on-screen. The last square of the puzzle is then displayed automatically once the other pieces have been lined up.

Group theory
As a famous example of the sliding puzzle, it can be proved that the 15 puzzle can be represented by the alternating group , because the combinations of the 15 puzzle can be generated by 3-cycles.

Gallery

Examples of sliding puzzles
 Fifteen puzzle
 Klotski
 Minus Cube
 Rush Hour
 Sokoban

See also
 Ro (video game) – A rotational variation
 Rubik's Cube

References

 Sliding Piece Puzzles (by Edward Hordern, 1986, Oxford University Press) is said to be the definitive volume on this type of puzzle.
 Winning Ways (by Elwyn Ralph Berlekamp et al., 1982, Academic Press)
 The 15 Puzzle (by Jerry Slocum & Dic Sonneveld, 2006, Slocum Puzzle Foundation)

US Patent 4872682 - sliding puzzle wrapped on Rubik's Cube

Mechanical puzzles
Combination puzzles